Jacquet is a tables game, played on the same type of board as Backgammon, that was once very popular in France and several other parts of Europe. It probably emerged around 1800, but is attested by 1827. In the 20th century it replaced the classic French backgammon the game of until Jacquet itself was superseded by Anglo-American games in the 1960s.

History 
Jacquet emerged around 1800 to become "the benchmark for tables games in France" gradually superseding Trictrac, the game that symbolised the Ancien Régime, and ousting it almost entirely by the end of the 19th century. The oldest known rules were published in 1818 by Lepeintre.

During the 19th century, confusion existed in French sources which sometimes equated Jacquet to Backgammon, but a distinctive feature was that the majority of pieces or men could not be moved until the first one, the courier, had reached the fourth quarter of the board. Other differences are that players start with all 15 men on their 24th point and then play in the same direction around the board.

Jacquet continued to be played into the 20th century largely dying out by the 1960s. However, Jacquet boards are still marketed and, more recently, rule sets have been published in French board game compendia. Léchalet (1979) stated that Jacquet was still the most popular tables game in France.

Principle 
Players move their men around the board and then wait until they are all in the last quarter to remove them off the board. The movement of the men is based on the roll of the dice. Either two men are moved, each based on the pip count of one of the two dice; or one man is moved based on the combined pip count. The special feature of Jacquet is the obligation to bring one of the men into the last quarter of the board before the rest are moved; this man is the 'courier' or 'postilion' (postillon). Once the postilion is in place, the rest may move forward. The goal of the game is to be the first player to bear all 15 of one's own men off the board.

Rules

Equipment 

Jacquet is played on a tables board of the type used for Backgammon with the exception of any storage strip, and with 15 pieces, known as men for each player, as well as two dice. Each player places fifteen men on the nearest section of the board and to the left, called the talon ("heel"). Movement is anticlockwise. For each of the players, the first quarter (French: table) is the group of the first six points on the left half of the player's own side of the board, the second quarter is made up of the next six to the right, the third quarter is the opponent's first quarter (opposite side to the right), and the fourth quarter is the opponent's second quarter.

Preliminaries 
Players dress the board by placing their 15 men at the top right of the board i.e. on the leftmost point on their opponent's side of the board. (This starting setup was also used in Révertier). Each player then rolls a die. The player with the higher number goes first, picks up both dice and throws them for the first move. Then the players take turns rolling the dice.

Movement 

The rules of movement are:
 On a single roll of the dice (where the 2 dice have different numbers) you can:
 Either move one man the value of one die and a second the value of the other die,
 Or move a single man the value of one of the two dice, then from this rest position move the same man by the value of the second dice again. It is imperative to mark a brief rest period on the intermediate point.
 On the roll of a doublet (where the value of each of the two dice is the same):
 The score is doubled e.g. rolling 4-4 means you have four 4's to play
 One to four men may be moved
 If a man is moved 2 to 4 times the value of a die, there must be a short pause on each intermediate point.

If unable to make a legal move, it is forfeited, i.e. any unplayable numbers are lost.

Restrictions on movement 

 Blocks. A man may not stop or even rest (this is why a rest period is marked) on a point occupied (blocked) by the adversary. On the other hand, a man may rest on an empty point or one occupied by one or more men of the same colour.
 Postilion. The first of the fifteen men of each player is the postilion or courier. It is placed on the tip of each point. When it enters the last quarter, it is placed at the base of the point concerned. Only then will the player be able to play the other men.

Obligation to play highest die 
 If one or the other of the two dice can be played but not both, one is obliged if possible to play the higher. This is the reason why, after the roll of the dice, the dice are called starting with the strongest (for example "4 and 2" and not "2 and 4"). It should be noted in passing that the "1" is not said to be "one" but "Ace" (As).
 In the event of a doublet, the greatest possible number of points must be played (while remaining, of course, an integer multiple of the value of a die).

Bearing off 
The process for bearing off the men is identical to that practised in Backgammon. Once they have entered the last quarter, they are removed from the board according to the following rules:
 In this phase, the outer rail of the board is counted as an additional point. 
 A man landing on the rail to the exact value, either of one die or both dice, has left the board.
 If it is not possible to move as above because the value of a die is greater than the distance of the furthest man from the end rail, it may be borne off e.g. if Marie rolls "6 and 5" but there are no men further than 4 from the rail, she may bear off those furthest away.

Blocking 
When a player occupies six adjacent points, it causes a bouchon ("bottleneck" or "blockade") which completely blocks the progression of the adversary's subsequent men; we speak of "blocking" the passage. This bouchon can be made anywhere on the board and its purpose is to slow down the advance of the opponent. However, there are two restrictions on blocking:
 the blocking of the postilion is prohibited;
 in order for a player to form a bouchon occupying the six points of the first quarter, the very last point of the route must also be occupied by that player.

Scoring 
The first player to bear off all 15 men scores 1 point. If this is achieved before the opponent bears off a single man, 2 points are scored.

Jacquet de Versailles 
A variant called Jacquet de Versailles was invented to speed up the game. The changes are:
 Doublets are squared, not doubled e.g. a double 5 is worth 25, not 20.
 Every die roll is used, so:
 The dice rolled to decide the lead are used on the first turn by the player rolling the higher die.
 If they roll a double, both players move their men and roll again for the lead.
 If a player cannot play a die, that player plays higher die and the opponent uses the other. 
 If a player cannot utilise either dice, the opponent plays them.
 If the opponent cannot play the two dice without uncovering a point, he immediately takes the lead and rethrows the second die.
Lêchalet (1976) reprints the above rules by Moulidars but calls it Le Jacquet Rapide.

Spanish Backgammon 
Hale describes rules for a variant known as "Spanish Backgammon or Jacquet". The key variation is that, once a player has borne off all 15 men, the opponent is penalised 3 points for every man left in the first table, 2 for every man in the second, and 1 point for every man left in the last table.

Footnotes

References

Literature 
 Faligot, Urbain (2001). Comment jouer au Backgammon, au Jacquet et au Trictrac. 2nd edn. (1st edn. 1998). 
 Fiske, Willard (1905). Chess in Iceland and Icelandic Literature: With Historical Notes on Other Table-Games. Florence: Florentine Typographical Society.
 Hale, Lucretia Peabody (1888). Fagots for the Fireside: A Collection of More Than One Hundred Entertaining Games for Evenings at Home and Social Parties. Boston: Ticknor.
 Lebrun, M. (1828), Manuel des jeux de calcul et de hasard, Roret, Gallica, pp. 85-86.
 Léchalet, Jacques (1987) Le Jacquet, Le Backgammon, Le Tric Trac, Le Solitaire, 2nd edn. (1st edn. 1979), Bornemann. 55 pp. 
 Lhôte, Jean-Marie (1994). Histoire des Jeux de Société. Flammarion. 671 pp. 
 Moulidars, Th. de (1888). Grande Encyclopédie Méthodique, Universelle, Illustrée des Jeux et des Divertissements de L'Esprit et du Corps. Paris. 
 Parlett, David (1999). The Oxford History of Board Games. Oxford: OUP, pp. 75–76 and 86.

External links
Jacquet rules at Backgammon Galore!
Le jeu de Jacquet - early rules at Le Salon des Jeux.
Le Jacquet rules and variations at loisirs.savoir.fr.

Tables games
French board games